The Antwerp Phantoms, also known as the Phantoms Deurne, are an ice hockey team in Deurne, Belgium. The Phantoms play in the BeNe League.

History
The club was founded in 1972, and won the Belgian Cup in 1988. From 1996 to 1998, they won three consecutive Belgian Cup titles. From 2001 to 2003, the club won three straight Belgian Hockey League titles, their only three to date. In 2005, they won their record eighth Belgian Cup. In the 2003–04 season, they participated in the IIHF Continental Cup. They were paired in a group with CH Jaca, FC Barcelona, and the Amstel Tijgers. They finished with one win, one loss, and one tie, defeating CH Jaca 8–3, tying FC Barcelona 4-4, and losing to the Amstel Tijgers 14–0.

Roster 
Updated February 19, 2019.

Achievements
Belgian champion (3): 2000, 2001, 2003, 2015
Belgian Cup champion (8): 1988, 1993, 1996, 1997, 1998, 2001, 2002, 2005

References

External links
Official Website
Club profile on hockeyarenas.net

BeNe League (ice hockey) teams
Ice hockey teams in Belgium
Ice hockey clubs established in 1972
1972 establishments in Belgium